The Dr. Andrew Castle House, also known as the Castle-Russell House, is a historic house at 555 Amity Road in Woodbridge, Connecticut.  Built in 1838, it is a locally distinguished example of high-style Greek Revival architecture, and is notable as the home of three prominent local physicians.  It was listed on the National Register of Historic Places in 2000.

Description and history
The Castle House is located in a rural setting of northeastern Woodbridge, on the east side of Amity Road (Connecticut Route 63).  It is set on a rise overlooking the road, a short way south of its junction with Seymour Road (Connecticut Route 67).  It is a -story wood-frame structure, with a gabled roof and clapboarded exterior.  Corner pilasters rise to a broad entablature on the front facade, above which the gable is fully pedimented, with a rectangular window in its center.  The facade is three bays wide, with the main entrance in the right bay.  It is sheltered by a well-proportioned portico, with Doric columns rising to an entablature and corniced flat roof.  A period wing extends to the south at a setback to the rear, with a flushboarded facade and shedroof portico at the inside corner.  A late 19th-century ell extends to the rear.

The house was probably built not long after Dr. Andrew Castle purchased the land from David Hotchkiss in 1838.  Its construction is attributed to George Sperry, a local master builder, on the basis of its similarity to two other houses he is known to have built.  The house is particularly distinguished for its interior and exterior craftsmanship, which are particularly fine in a town known for high quality 19th century architecture.  In addition to Dr. Castle, the house's owners have included Dr. David Elwood, a doctor and clergyman, and Dr. Thomas Russell, a doctor from New Haven.

See also
National Register of Historic Places listings in New Haven County, Connecticut

References

National Register of Historic Places in New Haven County, Connecticut
Houses on the National Register of Historic Places in Connecticut
Greek Revival architecture in Connecticut
Woodbridge, Connecticut